The Diocese of Tuam, Killala and Achonry (also known as the United Dioceses of Tuam, Killala and Achonry) is a former diocese in the Church of Ireland located in Connacht; the western province of Ireland. It was in the ecclesiastical province of Armagh. Its geographical remit included County Mayo and part of counties Galway and Sligo. In 2022, the diocese was amalgamated into the Diocese of Tuam, Limerick and Killaloe.

History
On 13 April 1834, the diocese of Killala and Achonry was united to the Archdiocese of Tuam. On the death of Archbishop Trench of Tuam in 1839, the Province of Tuam was united to the Province of Armagh and the see ceased to be an archbishopric and became a bishopric with Thomas Plunket becoming the first bishop of Tuam, Killala and Achonry.

Cathedrals

The bishop had two episcopal seats (Cathedra):
 St. Mary's Cathedral, Tuam
St. Patrick's Cathedral, Killala.

St. Crumnathy's Cathedral, Achonry was deconsecrated in 1998 and is now used for ecumenical events.

Parishes
Prior to its amalgamation, the diocese was divided into unions (or groups) of parishes.

Achonry Union:
 St. George's Church, Tubbercurry
 Rathbarron Church

Aughaval Group:
 Holy Trinity Church, Achill Sound
 Christ Church, Castlebar
 St. Thomas' Church, Dugort
 St. Thomas' Church, Knappagh
 Turlough Church
 Holy Trinity Church, Westport

Ballisodare Union:
 Holy Trinity Church, Ballisodare
 St. Paul's Church, Colloney
 Ballymote, Emlaghfad

Galway & Kilcummin:
 St. Nicholas' Collegiate Church, Galway
 Kilcummin Church, Oughterard

Killala Union:
 St. John's Church, Ballycastle
 St. Mary's Church, Crossmolina
 St. Patricks Cathedral, Killala

Kilmoremoy Union:
 St. Michael's, Ballina
 Killanley Church, Castleconnor
 St. Anne's Easkey
 Straid Church, Foxford
 Kilglass Church

Omey Union:
 Christ Church, Clifden
 Holy Trinity Church, Errislannan
 St. Thomas' Church, Moyard
 St. Mary's Church, Roundstone

Skreen Union:
 Christ Church, Dromard
 St. Mary's Church, Kilmacshalgan
 Skreen Church

Tuam Union:
 St. John the Baptist's Church, Aasleagh
 St. Mary's Church, Cong
 St. Mary's Cathedral, Tuam

List of bishops

 Hon. Thomas Plunket (1839–1866)
 Hon. Charles Brodrick Bernard (1867–1890)
 James O'Sullivan (1890–1913)
 Hon. Benjamin John Plunket (1913–1919)
 Arthur Edwin Ross (1920–1923)
 John Orr (1923–1927)
 John Mason Harden (1928–1931)

 William Hardy Holmes (1932–1938)
 John Winthrop Crozier (1939–1957)
 Arthur Hamilton Butler (1958–1969)
 John Coote Duggan (1970–1985)
 John Robert Winder Neill (1986–1997)
 Richard Crosbie Aitken Henderson (1998–2011)
 Patrick William Rooke (2011–2021)

See also

 List of Anglican dioceses in the United Kingdom and Ireland
 Archdiocese of Tuam (Church of Ireland)
 Roman Catholic Archdiocese of Tuam
 Roman Catholic Diocese of Killala
 Roman Catholic Diocese of Achonry
 Dean of Tuam
 Archdeacon of Tuam

References

External links
 Crockford's Clerical Directory – Listings

 
Religion in County Galway
Religion in County Mayo
Religion in County Sligo
Archdeacons of Killala and Achonry
Archdeacons of Tuam
Church of Ireland in the Republic of Ireland